Urrutia, meaning "distant, far away" in Basque (also known as Euskera) is the name of a family that originated in Zumárraga in the province of Gipuzkoa, and then spread out throughout the Basque country, and eventually throughout the Americas (South, Central, and North) and the Philippines.

People with the name 
Abraham Oyanedel Urrutia (1874–1954), Chilean politician and jurist
Alfonso Hortiz de Urrutia (1455–1503), Spanish humanist writer
Aliecer Urrutia (born 1974), Cuban athlete
Aureliano Urrutia (1871–1975), Mexican physician and politician
Benjamin Urrutia, Ecuadorian-American writer
Carlos Luis de Urrutia, 19th-century governor of Santo Domingo
Diego Dublé Urrutia, Chilean poet and diplomat 
Enrique Alvear Urrutia, Chilean bishop
Estíbaliz Urrutia, Spanish long-distance runner
Francisco de Paula Urrutia Ordóñez, Colombian diplomat
Francisco José Urrutia Olano, Colombian diplomat
Francisco José Urrutia Holguín, Colombian diplomat and jurist
Henry Urrutia (born 1987), Cuban baseball player
Iban Zubiaurre Urrutia, Spaniard footballer
Ignacio Bolivar y Urrutia (1850–1944), Spaniard naturalist and entomologist
Ignacio Jose Urrutia, Cuban historian
Ignacio Urrutia Manzano, Chilean politician
Ilma Urrutia, Guatemalan beauty pageant contestant
Jenaro de Urrutia Olaran, Basque painter
Jorge Urrutia, Chilean composer
Jorge Urrutia, Mexican mathematician
José Antonio Gómez Urrutia (born 1953), Chilean lawyer and politician
José de Urrutia, Tejano military
Josu Urrutia, Spaniard footballer
Juan Antonio de Urrutia y Arana, Mexican nobleman and patron of the arts
Karla Urrutia (born 1994), Mexican squash player
Luis Gilberto Murillo Urrutia (born 1967), Colombian engineer and politician
Manuel Urrutia Lleó, 20th President of Cuba
María Isabel Urrutia, Colombian athlete and politician
Matilde Urrutia, wife of Pablo Neruda
Miguel Urrutia Montoya, Colombian economist and politician
Osmani Urrutia (born 1976), Cuban baseball player
Patricio Urrutia, Ecuadorian footballer
Paulina Urrutia (born 1969), Chilean actress and politician
Pedro R. Pierluisi Urrutia (born 1959), Puerto Rican lawyer and politician
Roberto Urrutia, Cuban American Olympic weightlifter
Ruben Urrutia, Puerto Rican rapper
Santiago Urrutia, Uruguayan racing driver
Tatiana Urrutia, Chilean lawyer and politician
Wenceslao Ramírez de Villa-Urrutia, 1st Marquis of Villa-Urrutia, Spanish noble, politician and diplomat

See also 
 List of Basques
 List of people with Basque ancestors
 Thomson–Urrutia Treaty, a treaty between the United States and Colombia

Basque-language surnames